Maesil-ju, also called plum wine, plum liquor, or plum liqueur, is an alcoholic drink infused with maesil (plums).The exact origins of Maesil-ju are unknown, but it is thought to date back to the Goryeo Dynasty (918-1392).

Ingredients 
Maesil-ju is made with maesil ("plums"), preferably ripe hwangmae ("yellow plums"), which are yellowish in color, fragrant and firm. Unripe cheongmae ("green plums")—firmer and less fragrant—can also be used. Bruised or over-ripened plums may make the wine cloudy. Damaged fruits should be avoided, as direct contact of plum seeds with alcohol may produce a small amount of prussic acid, due to the amygdalin in plum seeds. However, toxicity vanishes after a year of maturation. Ripe plums have much lower amygdalin content.

Preparation 

Plums are washed in cold water and dried on a tray for a day. Dried plums and soju are added to a sterilized glass or earthenware jug and infused for about 100 days. The fruits are then removed by sieving, and sugar is added to the plum wine. The wine can be consumed immediately, but three to six months of maturation will greatly enrich the wine's flavour.

Commerce 

Popular maesil-ju products include Mae hwa soo, Matchsoon, and Seoljungmae.

See also 
 Maesil-cha, plum tea
 Maesil-cheong, plum syrup
 Umeshu, Japanese plum liqueur
 Suanmeitang, Chinese plum beverage

References 

Fruit liqueurs
Korean alcoholic drinks
Prunus